Scythris parenthesella is a moth of the family Scythrididae. It was described by Bengt Å. Bengtsson in 2002. It is found in the United Arab Emirates and Yemen.

References

parenthesella
Moths described in 2002